Gehard Hasa (born 23 February 1997) is an Albanian professional footballer who plays as an attacking midfielder for Albanian club Partizani.

References

External links
Profile at the Albanian Football Association
Profile at the Soccerway

1997 births
Living people
People from Tirana County
People from Tirana
Sportspeople from Tirana
Footballers from Tirana
Albanian footballers
Association football midfielders
Kategoria Superiore players
Kategoria e Parë players
Kategoria e Dytë players
FK Partizani Tirana players
KF Tirana players
FK Dinamo Tirana players